Canning is a state constituency in Perak, Malaysia, that has been represented in the Perak State Legislative Assembly.

Demographics

History

Polling districts 
According to the federal gazette issued on 31 October 2022, the Canning constituency is divided into 12 polling districts.

=Representation history

Results

References 

</ref>

Perak state constituencies